Zie may refer to:
 Zié Diabaté, an Ivorian football defender